The 36th Sports Emmy Awards was presented on May 5, 2015 at the Frederick P. Rose Hall at the Jazz at Lincoln Center in New York City. George Bodenheimer, former ESPN president, was honored with the Lifetime Achievement Award for Sports.

Awards
Winners in BOLD

Programs

Technical

Personalities

Lifetime Achievement Award
George Bodenheimer

Awards by Network Group

References

 033
Sports Emmy Awards
Emmy Awards
2015 in New York City
May 2015 sports events in the United States